Clinopodium is a genus of flowering plants in the family Lamiaceae. It is in the tribe Mentheae of the subfamily Nepetoideae, but little else can be said with certainty about its phylogenetic position.

The genus name Clinopodium is derived from the Latin clinopodion, from the Ancient Greek , from  "bed" and  "little foot". These were names for Clinopodium vulgare.

Clinopodium species are used as food plants by the larvae of some Lepidoptera species including Coleophora albitarsella.

Various Clinopodium species are used as medicinal herbs.

Taxonomy
Clinopodium has been defined very differently by different authors. Some have restricted it to as few as 13 species, all closely related to the type species, Clinopodium vulgare. In the latest revision of Lamiaceae, Clinopodium encompassed about 100 species, including those otherwise placed in the genera Acinos, Calamintha, and Xenopoma. This circumscription, called Clinopodium sensu lato, was shown to be polyphyletic in 2004, with additional information on the issue published in 2010.

Selected species

References

 
Taxa named by Carl Linnaeus
Lamiaceae genera